Anania piperitalis is a moth in the family Crambidae. It was described by George Hampson in 1913. It is found in Angola, Cameroon, the Democratic Republic of the Congo, Kenya and Uganda.

References

Moths described in 1913
Pyraustinae
Moths of Africa